Major General Roberts may refer to:

 Frederick Roberts, 1st Earl Roberts (1832–1914), one of the most successful British commanders of the Victorian era
 George Philip Bradley Roberts (1906–1997), British commander of an armoured division during World War II
 Sebastian Roberts (b. 1954), British Army general